

List of countries

References

Western Africa